Bela River may refer to:

Belá, a river in Slovakia
River Bela, a river in southern Cumbria, England
River Belah, a river in eastern Cumbria, England

See also
 White River (disambiguation)